Piotr Vladimirovich Chvertko (born on 3 October 1915) was a Soviet politician who was the 4th Chairman of the Committee for State Security (KGB) of the Moldavian Soviet Socialist Republic from 1966 till 1975.

Biography 
Chvertko was moved to Moldova from the Kyrgyz Soviet Republic. He was a specialist in counterespionage. His job in Chişinău refers to the Ivan Bodiul epoch of the Rule by Communist Party of the Moldavian Soviet Republic and the change in the leadership of the Communist Party of the Soviet Union. The Soviet leaders had an evident accent on the stopping of the nationalistic and bourgeois ideology. Some of the achievements of the Nikita Khrushchev epoch of de-Stalinization were underwented. The number of tourists from Romania and other countries (Israel, Europe) has reduced in number, since the change of the coming to the leadership of Communist Party by Leonid Brezhnev.
The main goals of activity of Chvertko in Moldova were:
 The control of Moldavian-Romanian contacts, and particularly:
 The control under readers of Romanian literature, leasteners of the Romanian radio and TV
 The control of private correspondence
 The supervision of the visits of tourists from Romania
 The intensification of the control under the persons which were made free from GULAG's
 The control under political dissidents
 The fight with Zionism
 The control under opponents of the Soviet constitutional system (dissidents).
The most known cases of dissidents of that epoch are:
Alexandru Şoltoianu (b. 1933, Ineshti village of Teleneshty region), the organizer of the first opposition Party in the Soviet Moldova and one of the first in the USSR,  a graduate from the Moscow Institute for International relations.
 Gheorghe Ghimpu
 Valeriu Graur
 Alexandru Usatiuc-Bulgăr
 Gheorghe Muruziuc
A number of processes refer to members of Communist Party, which were investigated by KGB:
 Serghei Radautsan - the rector of the Chişinău Politechinc Institute.
 Nicolae Testemiţanu - the rector of the Chişinău State Medical Institute
 Boris Alexandru Găină - the secretary of the Teleneshty regional committee of Communist Party.
 
Chvertko's period on the head of Moldavian KGB finished in 1975, when he was moved to German Democratic Republic as an officer at one of the Soviet Army units, placed in Dresden, where he continued to occupy by counterespionage.

Bibliography 
Teodor Botnaru, Alexandru Ganenko. Istoria serviciilor secrete. Breviar. Chişinău, Museum Eds., 2004, p. 220

Moldavian Soviet Socialist Republic people
Living people
KGB officers
Year of birth missing (living people)
Moldovan people of Polish descent
Jewish Moldovan politicians